In literature, an epigraph is a phrase, quotation, or poem that is set at the beginning of a document, monograph or section thereof. The epigraph may serve as a preface to the work; as a summary; as a counter-example; or as a link from the work to a wider literary canon, with the purpose of either inviting comparison or enlisting a conventional context.

A book may have an overall epigraphy that is part of the front matter, or one for each chapter.

Examples
 As the epigraph to The Sum of All Fears, Tom Clancy quotes Winston Churchill in the context of thermonuclear war:Why, you may take the most gallant sailor, the most intrepid airman or the most audacious soldier, put them at a table together – what do you get? The sum of their fears.
 The long quotation from Dante's Inferno that prefaces T. S. Eliot's "The Love Song of J. Alfred Prufrock" is part of a speech by one of the damned in Dante's Hell.
 The epigraph to E. L. Doctorow's Ragtime quotes Scott Joplin's instructions to those who play his music, "Do not play this piece fast. It is never right to play ragtime fast."
The epigraph to Fyodor Dostoyevsky's The Brothers Karamazov is John 12:24: "Verily, verily, I say unto you, except a corn of wheat fall into the ground and die, it abideth alone: but if it die, it bringeth forth much fruit."
The epigraph to Eliot's Gerontion is a quotation from Shakespeare's Measure for Measure. 
Eliot's "The Hollow Men" uses the line "Mistah Kurtz, he dead" from Joseph Conrad's Heart of Darkness as one of its two epigraphs.
 As an epigraph to The Sun Also Rises, Ernest Hemingway quotes Gertrude Stein, "You are all a lost generation."
 The epigraph to Theodore Herzl's Altneuland is "If you will it, it is no dream..." which became a slogan of the Zionist movement.
 Louis Antoine de Saint-Just's line "Nobody can rule guiltlessly" appears before chapter one in Arthur Koestler's 1940 anti-totalitarian novel Darkness at Noon.
 A Samuel Johnson quotation serves as an epigraph in Hunter S. Thompson's novel Fear and Loathing in Las Vegas: "He who makes a beast of himself gets rid of the pain of being a man."
 Stephen King uses many epigraphs in his writing, usually to mark the beginning of another section in a novel. An unusual example is The Stand wherein he uses lyrics from certain songs to express the metaphor used in a particular part.

 Jack London uses the first stanza of John Myers O'Hara's poem "Atavism" as the epigraph to The Call of the Wild.
 Cormac McCarthy opens his 1985 novel Blood Meridian with three epigraphs: quotations from French writer and philosopher Paul Valéry, from German Christian mystic and Gnostic Jacob Boehme, and a 1982 news clipping from the Yuma Sun reporting the claim of members of an Ethiopian archeological excavation that a fossilized skull three hundred millennia old seemed to have been scalped.
 The epigraphs to the preamble of Georges Perec's Life: A User's Manual (La Vie mode d'emploi) and to the book as a whole warn the reader that tricks are going to be played and that all will not be what it seems.

 J. K. Rowling's novels frequently begin with epigraphs relating to the themes explored. For example, Harry Potter and the Deathly Hallows opens with two: a quotation from Aeschylus's tragedy The Libation Bearers and a quotation from William Penn.
 Quotation from Woodrow Wilson's The State on the title page of every issue of The Bohemian Review, a magazine endorsing independence of Czechs and Slovaks to Austria-Hungary in 1917–1918 (example).

Fictional quotations
Some writers use as epigraphs fictional quotations that purport to be related to the fiction of the work itself. Examples include:

In films
 The film Talladega Nights: The Ballad of Ricky Bobby opens with a fictional quotation attributed to Eleanor Roosevelt for comedic effect.

In literature
 Some science fiction works, such as Isaac Asimov's Foundation Trilogy, Frank Herbert's Dune series, and Jack McKinney's Robotech novelizations use quotations from an imagined future history of the period of their story.
 Fantasy literature may also include epigraphs.  For example, Ursula K. Le Guin's Earthsea series includes epigraphs supposedly quoted from the epic poetry of the Earthsea archipelago.
 The first and last books of Diane Duane's Rihannsu series of Star Trek novels pair quotations from Lays of Ancient Rome with imagined epigraphs from Romulan literature.
 F. Scott Fitzgerald's The Great Gatsby opens with a poem entitled "Then Wear the Gold Hat," purportedly written by Thomas Parke D'Invilliers. D'Invilliers is a character in Fitzgerald's first novel, This Side of Paradise. 
This cliché is parodied by Diana Wynne Jones in The Tough Guide To Fantasyland.
 Jasper Fforde's The Eyre Affair has quotations from supposedly future works about the action of the story.
 John Green's The Fault in Our Stars has a quotation from a fictitious novel, An Imperial Affliction, which features prominently as a part of the story. 
 Stephen King's The Dark Half has epigraphs taken from the fictitious novels written by the protagonist.
 Dean Koontz's The Book of Counted Sorrows began as a fictional book of poetry from which Koontz would "quote" when no suitable existing option was available;  Koontz simply wrote all these epigraphs himself.  Many fans, rather than realizing the work was Koontz' own invention, apparently believed it was a real, but rare, volume; Koontz later collected the existing verse into an actual book.
 The Ring Verse at the beginning of J. R. R. Tolkien's The Lord of the Rings describes the Rings of Power, the central plot device of the novel.
 Akame Majyo's Time|Anthology begins each chapter with an excerpt from a fictional grimoire.
 Brandon Sanderson, in his Mistborn and Stormlight Archive series uses various epigraphs including letters between various gods, so-called "death rattles" and quotes from the villain's diary.

See also
Epigram, a brief, interesting, memorable, and sometimes surprising or satirical statement
Incipit, the first few words of a text, employed as an identifying label
Flavor text, applied to games and toys
Prologue, an opening to a story that establishes context and may give background
Keynote, the first non-specific talk on a conference spoken by an invited (and usually famous) speaker in order to sum up the main theme of the conference.

References

Bibliography

External links 

Epigraphic: an ever-growing, searchable collection of literary epigraphs
Epigraph at Literary Devices

Literature
Book design
Quotations

sv:Motto